Esfahanak (also Romanized as Eşfahānak and Isfahānak) is a village in Khoshkrud Rural District, in the Central District of Zarandieh County, Markazi Province, Iran. At the 2006 census, its population was 36, in 10 families.

References 

Populated places in Zarandieh County